Results of the 2000 Sri Lankan general election by province.

Number of votes

Percentage of votes

Seats

See also
Results of the 2000 Sri Lankan general election by electoral district

References
 

2000 Sri Lankan parliamentary election
Election results in Sri Lanka